Where Is Madame Catherine? is a 2003 French-Spanish comedy film directed by Marc Recha. It was entered into the Un Certain Regard section at the 2003 Cannes Film Festival.

Cast
 Dominique Marcas - Madame Catherine
 Jérémie Lippmann - Axel
 Olivier Gourmet - Eric
 Eduardo Noriega - Gerard
 Jeanne Favre - Lola
 Sébastien Viala - Philippe
 Rajko Nikolic - Monsieur Georges
 Eulalia Ramón - Maria
 Mireille Perrier - Sophie
 Mireia Ros - Anna
 Pierre Berriau - Yann
 Luis Hostalot - Jean-Claude
 Francesc Tollet - Octave

See also 
 List of French films of 2003
 List of Spanish films of 2003

References

External links

2003 films
Spanish comedy films
French comedy films
2000s Spanish-language films
Catalan-language films
2003 comedy films
Films directed by Marc Recha
2000s French films
2000s Spanish films